Christchurch Central Library was a library in Central Christchurch and the main library of Christchurch City Libraries, New Zealand. It was the largest library in the South Island and the third-biggest in New Zealand. It opened in 1982 on the corner of Oxford Terrace and Gloucester Street but was closed on the day of the 22 February 2011 Christchurch earthquake. The building was demolished in 2014 to make way for the Convention Centre Precinct. The replacement library, Tūranga, opened in 2018.

History
The Christchurch library dates back to 1859 and the original library buildings were on the corner of Cambridge Terrace and Hereford Street. Eventually over 100 years old, a replacement was needed, and after years of searching for a suitable site, the property on the corner of Gloucester Street and Oxford Terrace was purchased in 1974. The new site was again facing the Avon River, was across the river from the historic Canterbury Provincial Council Buildings, and was only a short walk away from the town centre in Cathedral Square.

The architecture firm Warren and Mahoney was engaged to design the building, and Charles Luney was the principal contractor. The total price for the site and construction was NZ$5.8m. The building was opened by Sir David Beattie, the Governor-General, on 2 February 1982. Membership grew dramatically after the opening, and within three months, 10,000 new members were gained.

The ground floor and the first floor were linked by an escalator, with the second and third floor used for internal services. Another one and a half floors were added in 1997, and another escalator was added from the first to the second floor, expanding the area open to the public. Further changes were made to the building in 2001.

Earthquakes

Whilst the library building suffered little structural damage in the 22 February 2011 Christchurch earthquake, the central city was declared a redzone and the city centre was not accessible to the public. With the red zone cordon shrinking over time, alternative central city library locations were established in South City Mall (8 July 2011 – 15 July 2012), Peterborough Street (19 December 2011 – present), Tuam Street (July 2012 – November 2013), and Manchester Street (20 January 2014 – present). The Tuam Street library was conveniently located adjacent to the temporary bus exchange and became necessary as more books were recovered from the central building in Gloucester Street, but it closed again as the land was designated for the Justice and Emergency Services Precinct.

The Christchurch Central Library building was located within the area that the Christchurch Central Recovery Plan designated for the Convention Centre Precinct and for that reason, the building was demolished during September and October 2014. The replacement library, named Tūranga, opened in October 2018.

References

External links

Central Library Peterborough
Central Library Manchester

Libraries in Christchurch
Library buildings completed in 1982
Buildings and structures demolished in 2014
Buildings and structures in Christchurch
Christchurch Central City
Buildings and structures demolished as a result of the 2011 Christchurch earthquake